"The Rascal King" is a song by the Mighty Mighty Bosstones and the second single from their 1997 studio album, Let's Face It. "The Rascal King," the follow-up to the lead single, "The Impression That I Get," reached number seven on the US Billboard Modern Rock Tracks chart and number four on the Canadian RPM Alternative 30.

Inspiration
The song was inspired by James Michael Curley, a former Mayor of Boston and Governor of Massachusetts.

Charts

Weekly charts

Year-end charts

References

1997 singles
1997 songs
Mercury Records singles
The Mighty Mighty Bosstones songs
Ska songs
Songs about Boston
Songs about American politicians